The Seven-Day War can refer to the:

Polish–Czechoslovak War, fought between Poland and Czechoslovakia, from January 23 to January 30, 1919. Known in Czech sources as the Seven-Day War.
Operation Accountability, fought between Israel and Hezbollah from July 25 to July 31, 1993.
 Seven day war, fought between the African National Congress and the Inkatha Freedom Party from 25 March to 31 March 1990.